Mary L. Smith (born August 28, 1962) is an American lawyer and former principal deputy director and acting director of the Indian Health Services from October 2015 to February 2017. Previously she was general counsel for the Illinois Department of Insurance. From 2009 until August 2010, she had been a presidential nominee to be the Assistant Attorney General for the Tax Division of the United States Department of Justice.  However, she was never confirmed by the Senate, and the White House in 2010 decided not to renominate her to the post.

Early life and education 
A Native American and member of the Cherokee Nation, Smith was born in Chicago.  She earned a bachelor's degree magna cum laude in May 1984 from Loyola University Chicago.  She attended Loyola University Chicago School of Law from 1988 until 1989, and then transferred to the University of Chicago Law School, where she spent her final two years and earned her Juris Doctor (J.D.) in 1991.

Smith worked as a law clerk for United States Court of Appeals for the Eleventh Circuit Judge R. Lanier Anderson III from 1991 until 1992.

Professional career 
Smith worked as a systems programmer for Walgreens from 1984 until 1987 and as a senior systems engineer for Northern Trust Corporation from 1987 until 1988.

After law school, Smith took a job as an associate with the law firm of Ross & Hardies, where she worked from 1992 until 1994.  From 1994 until 1996, Smith worked as a trial attorney for the Commercial Litigation Branch of the United States Department of Justice's Civil Division.

From June 1996 until November 1996, Smith worked for the campaign to re-elect President Bill Clinton.  She then worked for several months afterward as a revenue assistant for Clinton's inaugural committee.

For several months in 1997, Smith served as a policy/research analyst for the Welfare to Work Partnership in Washington, D.C.  From May 1997 until April 2000, Smith worked as the Associate Director of Policy Planning for the United States Domestic Policy Council in the Clinton administration.  From April 2000 until January 2001, Smith served as the Associate Counsel to the President in the White House Counsel's office.

From 2001 until 2005, Smith worked as a senior associate for Skadden, Arps, Slate, Meagher & Flom in Washington, D.C.  She then worked from 2005 until 2007 as senior litigation counsel for Tyco International.

From June 2008 until November 2009, Smith worked as a partner at the Chicago law firm of Schoeman Updike Kaufman & Scharf.

Smith was a counselor for the U.S. Department of Justice from 2010 until 2012.  She then became general counsel for the Illinois Department of Insurance in June 2012.

Nomination to be Assistant Attorney General 
On April 8, 2009, Smith was nominated by President Barack Obama to be Assistant Attorney General for the DOJ's Tax Division. Republican senators have objected to Smith's nomination, contending that she has little to no tax experience. However, in June 2009, the United States Senate Committee on the Judiciary voted 12-7 along party lines to send Smith's nomination to the full Senate.

While waiting to be confirmed, Smith resigned from Schoeman Updike and moved to Washington to take a job in the United States Department of Justice Civil Division as a senior counsel to Tony West, the Assistant Attorney General for that division. Smith began in that job on February 10, 2010.

Although Smith would have been the highest-ranking Native American ever to serve in the Department of Justice, Republicans in the Senate twice returned Smith's nomination to the White House. After Republicans did so in August 2010, White House officials said Obama would not renominate her to the post and that she would pursue other opportunities.

Personal
Smith lives in Lansing, Illinois and also has a condominium unit in the Streeterville neighborhood of Chicago.

References

1962 births
Living people
20th-century American lawyers
21st-century American lawyers
20th-century Native Americans
21st-century Native Americans
Cherokee Nation lawyers
Illinois Democrats
Lawyers from Chicago
Loyola University Chicago alumni
Native American lawyers
Skadden, Arps, Slate, Meagher & Flom people
Trial lawyers
University of Chicago Law School alumni
20th-century American women lawyers
21st-century American women lawyers
20th-century Native American women
21st-century Native American women